Picea wilsonii is a species of conifer in the family Pinaceae. It is found only in China.

References

wilsonii
Least concern plants
Picea wilsonii
Picea wilsonii
Taxonomy articles created by Polbot